The premier of South Australia is the head of government in the state of South Australia, Australia. The Government of South Australia follows the Westminster system, with a Parliament of South Australia acting as the legislature. The premier is appointed by the governor of South Australia, and by modern convention holds office by virtue of his or her ability to command the support of a majority of members of the lower house of Parliament, the House of Assembly.

Peter Malinauskas is the current premier, having served since 21 March 2022.

History

The office of premier of South Australia was established upon the commencement of responsible government with the passage of the Constitution Act 1856. The role was based upon that of the prime minister of the United Kingdom, with the premier requiring the support of a majority of the members of the lower house to remain head of government.

No parties or solid groupings would be formed until after the 1890 election, which resulted in frequent changes of the premier of South Australia. If for any reason the incumbent premier lost sufficient support through a successful motion of no confidence at any time on the floor of the house, he would tender his resignation to the governor of South Australia, which would result in another member deemed to have the support of the House of Assembly being sworn in by the governor as the next premier.

Informal groupings began and increased government stability occurred from the 1887 election. The United Labor Party would be formed in 1891, while the National Defence League would be formed later in the same year.

Before the 1890s when there was no formal party system in South Australia, MPs tended to have historical liberal or conservative beliefs. The liberals dominated government from the 1893 election to 1905 election with the support of the South Australian United Labor Party, with the conservatives mostly in opposition. Labor took government with the support of eight dissident liberals in 1905 when Labor won the most seats for the first time. The rise of Labor saw non-Labor politics start to merge into various party incarnations.

The two independent conservative parties, the Australasian National League (formerly National Defence League) and the Farmers and Producers Political Union merged with the Liberal and Democratic Union to become the Liberal Union in 1910. Labor formed South Australia's first majority government after winning the 1910 state election, triggering the merger. The 1910 election came two weeks after federal Labor formed Australia's first elected majority government at the 1910 federal election.

No "Country" or rural conservative parties emerged as serious long-term forces in South Australian state politics, often folding into the main non-Labor party.

List of premiers of South Australia
The first six governors of South Australia oversaw governance from proclamation in 1836 until self-government and an elected Parliament of South Australia was enacted in the year prior to the inaugural 1857 election.

Timeline

In the following timeline, the legend includes the Liberal and Democratic Union, the Liberal Union and the Liberal Federation represented as "Liberal (pre-1979)". The Liberal Party is represented as "Liberal (post-1979)" only. The grey area represents the duration of Playmander electoral malapportionment, beginning in 1936, in effect until the 1970 election.

See also

 List of premiers of South Australia by time in office 
 Deputy Premier of South Australia
 Leader of the Opposition (South Australia)

References

 Statistical Record of the Legislature 1836 – 2007

External links
 Biographies of all premiers at the SA Parliament web site
 UWA state and federal election results since 1890

South Australia
Premiers
Ministers of the South Australian state government